Wushu at the 2015 Southeast Asian Games was held at the Singapore Expo Hall 2 in Tampines, Singapore from 6 to 8 June 2015.

Participating nations
A total of 113 athletes from 10 nations competed in wushu at the 2015 Southeast Asian Games:

Medalists

Men's taolu

Men's sanda

Women's taolu

Medal table

References

External links
 

2015
Southeast Asian Games
2015 Southeast Asian Games events